National Highway 160B, commonly referred to as NH 160B is a national highway in India. It is a secondary route of National Highway 60.  NH-160B runs in the state of Maharashtra in India.

Route 
NH160B connects Zagade Phata and Kopargaon in the state of Maharashtra.

Junctions  
 
  Terminal near Zagade Phata.
  Terminal near Kopargaon.

See also 
 List of National Highways in India
 List of National Highways in India by state

References

External links 

 NH 160B on OpenStreetMap

National highways in India
National Highways in Maharashtra